Ferenc Mészáros is the name of:

 Ferenc Mészáros (footballer, born 1919) (1919–1977), Hungarian/Romanian footballer
 Ferenc Mészáros (footballer, born 1950) (1950–2023), Hungarian footballer
 Ferenc Mészáros (footballer, born 1963) (born 1963), Hungarian footballer